Mammoth is a BBC One television series. Mike Bubbins, who gave up his job as a PE Teacher to make a career in comedy,  conceived of the show in which he stars and serves as a writer. The show is one of six pilots, tasters etc unveiled by BBC Wales. The pilot episode was released in 2021.

Plot
The programme opens with a slightly out of focus old video of a ski resort including special effects indicating an avalanche.  A voice over gives the background to the set up:

The scene switches to the present day with Mammoth in his 1970s splendour emerging out of his Ford Capri II in the school car park, with a couple of slightly bemused pupils looking on. The narration continues:

He has returned to his job as a PE teacher at the same school. He seems a perfectly preserved man in his forties, though one born eighty six years ago.

Events get underway with him giving his 1970's friend Roger, now seventy, some tickets to a Hot Chocolate concert as a birthday present – “I don’t do cards!”. He's currently staying with Roger, sleeping on a mattress in Rogers Old Peoples apartment.

The school's headmaster, Kane, is the son of the schools 1970's headmaster, they both think little of Mammoth. Mammoth is equally dismissive of them, including Kane jnr's hobby of marathon running, which Mammoth says is just training for real sport.

Mammoth's heroes include Huggy Bear, Starsky and Hutch, Burt Reynolds and Evel Knievel – other cultural references to the seventies include Jonathan E from Rollerball, CB radio, pina colada, Dickie Davies, playing shirts against skins football ....

Other than Kane, most other people are won over by Mammoths easy charm - his colleague Lucy, his psychiatrist Claire, Liberty one of his troubled pupils, Miss Ronson the chair of governors and Kirsty from the pub. Judy Jones suggests he or Roger pop round to see her.

The Mike Bubbins site has indicated that there might be more from Tony Mammoth in 2023

Cast
Tony Mammoth - Mike Bubbins  
Roger Buck - Joseph Marcell  
Richard Kane – Dyfan Dwyfor
Lucy Manford - Mali Ann Rees  
Liberty Curtis - Darryl Mundoma  
Claire Deering - Caitlin Richards 
Judy Jones - Olwen Rees  
Kirsty - Janina Anderson 
Diane Ronson - Catrin Powell

Soundtrack
Gerry Rafferty – get it right first time
Gary Numan – Cars
Hot Chocolate – Girl Crazy
T.Rex (band) – Solid Gold Easy Action
Boney M – Rasputin
Boney M – Daddy Cool
The Real Thing (British band) – Can't get by without you

Reception
Nicola Ryan praised the show, writing for Wales Arts Review, "Packed with 70s reference points and a killer soundtrack, Mammoth is a perfect watch for lovers of warm and fuzzy feelings with a few laughs along the way." In his review of the show for Chortle, Steve Bennett said, "if you prefer a little grit in your sitcoms or big exaggerated gags, look elsewhere, but for coridal smiles from an engaging character, Mammoth might be your man."

References

BBC Cymru Wales television shows